Tamara is a 2016 Venezuelan film directed by Elia Schneider. The film is about a  successful lawyer who takes the decision to start a gender transition. It is inspired in the life of Tamara Adrián, the first transgender person elected to the National Assembly in Venezuela and the second transgender member of a national legislature in the Americas. It became the highest-grossing film in Venezuela in 2016.

Plot 
The film revolves around Teo, a successful lawyer and university professor, married and with two children, who decides to start a gender transition.

Production 
Schneider tried to present the film as a representation of transphobia and not as a biographical film. Although key moments of the life of the politician remained, the script was rewritten several times to conceal aspects of her life. According to Tamara Adrián, around 40% of the film was reality, while the rest was fiction. Luis Fernández, the actor that depicted Teo, said that it was the most difficult role of his career and that it was the first time that he interpreted a woman. Fernández met with Tamara herself to design the character. At the end he decided not to imitate her, but rather tried to express how he would have felt in a similar situation.

Despite being filmed in 2013, Tamara was screened in November 2016 after delayals due to artistic decisions, the devaluation of the Venezuelan currency and afterwards due to the government's decision to limit the power schedule in malls.

Tamara Adrián made a cameo in the film with the role of a university rector.

Reception 
Upon release, 19,341 tickets were sold in Venezuela by 27 November, surpassing From Afar, awarded with the Golden Lion at the 72nd Venice International Film Festival, which sold 16,924 tickets during its time at the cinemas.

The film received a recognition by the Ibero American General Secretariat (SEGIB) for its script and was selected in a list of the 14 best movies screened at the International Film Festival of India. It was also awarded with the San Bárbara Festival Best Film Nueva Vision Award for Spain/Latin American Cinema. The film was nominated to nine MIFF Awards at the Milan Film Festival.

See also 
 Venezuelan LGBT+ cinema

References

External links 
 
 Film Affinity

2016 LGBT-related films
Films about trans women
LGBT-related drama films
Venezuelan LGBT-related films
2010s Spanish-language films